South Indian Lake Airport  is located  east of South Indian Lake, Manitoba, Canada.

References

External links

Certified airports in Manitoba